Squib or Squibb may refer to:

 Squib (explosive), a miniature explosive with a very small charge
 Bullet hit squib, a practical effect simulating a gunshot wound in film and theatre
 Squib (Harry Potter)
 Squib (Star Wars)
 Squib (writing)
 Squib, Kentucky
 Squib kick, an American football play
 Squib load, a firearm malfunction
 Squib sailboat
 Squibs (1921 film), a 1921 film starring Betty Balfour
 Squibs (1935 film), a 1935 remake film also starring Balfour
 Bristol-Myers Squibb, an American pharmaceutical company based in New York City
 Squibb Park, an urban elevated park in Brooklyn, New York

People 
E. R. Squibb, the chemist
George Drewry Squibb - British lawyer
June Squibb - American actress

See also 
 Squab (disambiguation)